Class 73 may refer to:
British Rail Class 73, a British electro-diesel locomotive
 DRG Class 73, a class of German passenger tank engines with a 2-4-4T wheel arrangement operated by the Deutsche Reichsbahn and comprising:
 73 001 to 028: Palatine P 2.II
 73 031 to 124: Bavarian D XII
 73 131 to 139: Bavarian Pt 2/5 N
 73 201: Bavarian Pt 2/5 H
NSB Class 73, a Norwegian electric multiple unit